Będzin (also Bendzin in English;) is a city in the Dąbrowa Basin, in southern Poland. It lies in the Silesian Highlands, on the Czarna Przemsza River (a tributary of the Vistula). Even though part of Silesian Voivodeship, Będzin belongs to historic Lesser Poland, and it is one of the oldest towns of this province. Będzin is regarded as the capital of industrial Dąbrowa Basin.

It has been situated in the Silesian Voivodeship since its formation in 1999. Before 1999, it was located in the Katowice Voivodeship. Będzin is one of the cities of the 2.7 million conurbation - Katowice urban area and within a greater Silesian metropolitan area populated by about 5,294,000 people. The population of the city itself as of December 2021 is 55,183.

Together with Sosnowiec, Dąbrowa Górnicza, Czeladź, Wojkowice, Sławków and Siewierz it is a part of Zagłębie Dąbrowskie, a highly industrialized and densely populated part of western Lesser Poland. Będzin borders the cities of Sosnowiec, Dąbrowa Górnicza, Czeladź, Siemianowice Śląskie, and Wojkowice, as well as the village of Psary.

Districts
Będzin is divided into eight districts: Grodziec in 1951–1975 was a separate town, Gzichów is part of Będzin since 1915, Ksawera is part of Będzin since 1923, Łagisza in 1967–1973 was a separate town, Małobądz is part of Będzin since 1915, Śródmieście is the historic center, Warpie is part of Będzin since 1923.

Etymology
The name Będzin most probably comes from ancient Polish given name Beda or Bedzan. In the past, the town was also called Banden, Bandin, Bandzien, Bondin, Bandzen, Bandzin, Badzin, Bendzin, and Bendsburg (1939–1945).

History

First mention of the village of Będzin comes from 1301, but a settlement (or a grod) had existed here since the 9th century, guarding ancient trade route from Kyiv to Western Europe. In the 1340s, a town was founded here, with King Casimir III the Great building a stone strongpoint. On August 5, 1358, Będzin was incorporated as a town, and became a royal city of Poland, administratively located in the Kraków Voivodeship in the Lesser Poland Province of the Polish Crown.

In the Jagiellonian period Będzin, located on the border between Lesser Poland and Silesia, was a major trade center. In 1565 King Sigismund II Augustus allowed the town to have five markets a week, and in 1589, at Będzin Castle, Polish–Austrian negotiations took place. At that time, a Jewish community already existed here. In 1655, during The Deluge, both town and castle were destroyed by the Swedes, and Będzin did not recover from the destruction for many years. Following the Third Partition of Poland, in 1795 the town was annexed by the Kingdom of Prussia, and was included within the newly established province of New Silesia. In 1807 it was regained by Poles and included in the short-lived Duchy of Warsaw and in 1815 it became part of Russian-controlled Congress Poland.

Industrial revolution

In the late 18th century rich deposits of coal were found in the area. In the 19th century, Będzin and its vicinity enjoyed a period of rapid industrialization and urbanization. New settlements and towns were founded, and the region of Zagłębie Dąbrowskie was established in southwestern corner of Congress Poland. In 1858, Będzin got its first rail connection, due to construction of the Warsaw–Vienna railway. The town increased in population and size, when town limits were expanded by including neighboring settlements. During the January Uprising, in February 1863, Będzin was captured by Polish insurgents after their victory in the Battle of Sosnowiec nearby.

The Będzin Power Station was opened in 1913.

Będzin was eventually restored to Poland, when the country regained independence in 1918, after World War I. In the Second Polish Republic Będzin was an important center of local administration and industry. New rail station, waterworks, schools and offices were built.

World War II
During the German invasion of Poland, which started World War II, the Wehrmacht entered Będzin on September 4, 1939, and in the following days the Germans committed the first atrocities in the city. On September 6, the Germans murdered 20 Poles, and on September 9, they murdered 100 Jews, set fire to the synagogue and Jewish houses, and then in attempt to blame the Poles they arrested and executed 42 Poles. Local Polish parish priest  rescued a group of Jews who escaped the German massacre by opening the gates of the Holy Trinity church to them and giving them shelter. The German police carried out mass searches of Polish houses. Inhabitants of Będzin were also among Poles murdered in Celiny in June 1940. The Będzin Ghetto was established by the German occupational authority in July 1940. During the occupation, the city's name was changed to a German form, Bendsburg, and it was part of Upper Silesia Province, as the capital of Landkreis Bendsburg.

During the war the city was the base for a working party (E716) of British and Commonwealth prisoners of war, under the administration of Stalag VIII-B/344 at Łambinowice (then known as Lamsdorf). In January 1945, as the Soviet armies resumed their offensive and advanced from the east, the prisoners were marched westward in the so-called Long March or Death March. Many of them died from the bitter cold and exhaustion. The lucky ones got far enough to the west to be liberated by the allied armies after some four months of travelling on foot in appalling conditions. Their sufferings, though severe, pale by comparison to those of the Jews of Będzin (see below). In 1943–1944, the Germans also operated a subcamp of the Auschwitz concentration camp in the present-day district of Łagisza, in which they held and brutalized from 300 to over 700 prisoners as forced labourers.

In August 1943, as the Germans attempted to round up the last Jews still in Będzin, Jewish resistance fighters staged an armed revolt that lasted several days.  One of the leaders was a woman, Frumka Plotnicka, who had earlier been a fighter in Warsaw in the ghetto revolt there. All the resistance fighters were killed in the action. More than 1000 Będzin Jews survived the war, several given help by local Poles.

On January 27, 1945, the town was captured by the Red Army. Subsequently, the castle was rebuilt, now housing the Museum of Zagłębie. New districts with blocks of flats were built and new factories were opened, including the Łagisza Power Station.

Jewish community

Until World War II, Będzin had a vibrant Jewish community. According to the Russian census of 1897, out of the total population of 21,200, Jews constituted 10,800 (around 51% percent). According to the Polish census of 1921 the town had a Jewish community consisting of 17,298 people, or 62.1 percent of its total population. In September 1939, the German Army (Wehrmacht) overran this area, followed by the SS death squads (Einsatzgruppen), who burned the Będzin synagogue and murdered 200 Jewish inhabitants. A Będzin Ghetto was created in 1942. Eventually, in the summer of 1943, most of the Jews in Będzin were deported to the nearby German Auschwitz concentration camp. Since Będzin was one of the last Polish communities to be liquidated, there are a relatively large number of survivors from there, and an extensive collection of their personal photographs were recovered, offering photographic insight into the pre-war life there.

Transport
Będzin is conveniently located at the intersection of two national roads - the 94th (Zgorzelec - Kraków), and the 86th (Katowice -Warsaw). The town also is a rail hub, where two connections meet. Będzin has three rail stations (Będzin-Miasto, Będzin and Będzin-Ksawera), and convenient bus and tram connections to neighboring cities. The first tram line was opened there in 1928. At that time the Black Przemsza River which runs through the city was also an important transport hub. The "Black" Przemsza is so named because the river bed as it flows through Będzin exposes a coal seam, making the water above it appear black.

Sports
The city's most notable sports club is volleyball team MKS Będzin, which competes in the PlusLiga (Poland's top division).

Notable people
 Yitzchok Zilberstein (born 1931), Rabbi and halakhist
 Hermann Nunberg (1884–1970), psychoanalyst and neurologist, assistant of Carl Jung, disciple of Sigmund Freud
 Isser (Birencwajg) Be'eri (1901–1958), Director of the Haganah Intelligence Service
 Joshua Prawer (1917–1990), Israeli historian, founder of the crusader studies
 Sam Pivnik (1926–2017), Holocaust survivor; writer of Survivor: Auschwitz, The Death March and My Fight for Freedom
 Rutka Laskier (1929–1943), diarist; Holocaust victim
 Saul Merin (1933–2012), Ophthalmologist
 Janusz Gajos (born 1939), actor
 Grzegorz Dolniak (1960–2010), politician
 Andrzej Kubica (born 1972), footballer
 Monika Jarosińska (born 1974), actress and singer
 Sigmund Strochlitz (1916–2006), American activist and Holocaust survivor

International relations

Twin towns - sister cities

Będzin is twinned with:
 Basse-Ham, France
 Kaišiadorys, Lithuania
 Tatabánya, Hungary

Former twin towns:
 Izhevsk, Russia

In March 2022, Będzin terminated its partnership with the Russian city of Izhevsk as a response to the 2022 Russian invasion of Ukraine.

References
Notes

Bibliography

 
 Mary Fulbrook, A Small Town near Auschwitz: Ordinary Nazis and the Holocaust (Oxford University Press, 2012)

External links

 Official website 
 
 A memorial to the Jewish community of Będzin
 Zagłębie shtetls
 A small town near Auschwitz

 
Cities and towns in Silesian Voivodeship
Będzin County
Shtetls
Kraków Voivodeship (14th century – 1795)
Piotrków Governorate
Kielce Voivodeship (1919–1939)
Populated places established in the 9th century
Holocaust locations in Poland